Mangana is a rural locality in the local government area (LGA) of Break O'Day in the North-east LGA region of Tasmania. The 2016 census recorded a population of 36 for the state suburb of Mangana.

History 
Mangana was gazetted as a locality in 1973. The name was in use by 1877. 

Gold was discovered in the area in 1852. It was named for an Aboriginal who was the father of Truganini.

Geography
The boundaries of the locality are a combination of ridgelines and survey lines.

Road infrastructure 
Route B42 (Mangana Road / Rossarden Road) enters from the south-east, runs north-west to the village, then south-west to the southern boundary. From there it follows the southern boundary to the south-west corner. Route C429 (Tower Hill Road) runs north along the eastern boundary before passing through the north-east corner.

References

Towns in Tasmania
Localities of Break O'Day Council